Der Tagesspiegel (meaning The Daily Mirror) is a German daily newspaper. It has regional correspondent offices in Washington D.C. and Potsdam. It is the only major newspaper in the capital to have increased its circulation, now 148,000, since reunification. Der Tagesspiegel is a liberal newspaper that is classified as centrist media in the context of German politics.

History and profile 

For more than 45 years, Der Tagesspiegel was owned by an independent trust. In 1993, in response to an increasingly competitive publishing environment, and to attract investments required for technical modernisation, such as commission of a new printing plant, and improved distribution, it was bought by the Georg von Holtzbrinck Publishing Group. Pierre Gerckens, Giovanni di Lorenzo and Hermann Rudolph are editors of the newspaper. Some of the notable writers include Bas Kast and Harald Martenstein.

The paper's main readership is in the western half of the city, due to the 1948 blockade having stopped its circulation in East Berlin and Brandenburg. The paper has recently been redesigned, introducing more colour and a clearer typeface. In 2005 it was awarded the World's Best-Designed Newspapers Award by the Society for News Design in New York. It is owned by Verlag Der Tagesspiegel GmbH, a member of the Georg von Holtzbrinck Publishing Group, and associated with the Wall Street Journal. In 2009, Dieter von Holtzbrinck bought Der Tagesspiegel and Handelsblatt from Holtzbrinck.

From 2005 to 2008, American journalist Michael Scaturro edited the English-language version of Der Tagesspiegel, which was known as The Berlin Paper.

In 2007 and 2008 Der Tagesspiegel'''s Washington D.C. correspondent, Christoph von Marschall, was noted in both Germany and the United States for his coverage of Barack Obama's presidential campaign. He wrote a book entitled Barack Obama – Der schwarze Kennedy''. The literal translation of its German title is "Barack Obama – the Black Kennedy". His book was a bestseller in Germany, where other commentators had also compared the two Americans.

References

External links 

 Official website 
 Society for News Design Tagesspiegel World's Best-Designed Detail Page

 
1945 establishments in Germany
Centrist newspapers
Daily newspapers published in Germany
German-language newspapers
German news websites
Liberal media in Germany
Liberalism in Germany
Newspapers published in Berlin
Newspapers established in 1945